Vitali Mikhaylovich Eliseev (born 26 February 1950) is a retired Russian rower who had his best achievements in the coxless fours, together with Valeriy Dolinin, Aleksandr Kulagin and Aleksey Kamkin. In this event they won a world title in 1981 and silver medals at the 1980 Summer Olympics and 1982 World Rowing Championships. Previously, Eliseev and Kulagin also won a world title in the coxless pairs in 1977.

References

External links
 

1950 births
Living people
Russian male rowers
Soviet male rowers
Olympic rowers of the Soviet Union
Rowers at the 1980 Summer Olympics
Olympic silver medalists for the Soviet Union
Olympic medalists in rowing
Sportspeople from Ganja, Azerbaijan
World Rowing Championships medalists for the Soviet Union
Medalists at the 1980 Summer Olympics